The Second Battle of Târgu Frumos was a military engagement primarily between the Wehrmacht and Red Army forces in May 1944, near Iași, Romania. The battle was the main engagement of the Târgu Frumos Operation, and is often referred simply as the Battle of Târgu Frumos.

Military historian David Glantz claims the battle was part of what he termed First Jassy-Kishinev Offensive, resulted from a Stavka order to the forces of the 2nd & 3rd Ukrainian Fronts to commence a coordinated invasion of Romania. It was directed towards Iași with a secondary objective of establishing bridgeheads across the Prut river.

The battle was only briefly described by Soviet historians. Recently, Russian historians have begun describing this as a distinct battle. For example, the four volume Great Patriotic War (1998) prepared for the Russian Federation states:
Thus, during the Târgu-Frumos operation, the 2nd Ukrainian Front's forces tried unsuccessfully to complete a deep penetration of the enemy's defense and reach the territory between the Prut & Siret Rivers. By order of the Stavka, they themselves went over to the defensive along existing lines on 6 May.... The several attempts by the 3rd Ukrainian Front's armies to conduct attacks from their Dnestr bridgeheads & seize new bridgeheads also led to nothing.

According to accounts by Hasso von Manteuffel, one of the two German division commanders, and Ferdinand Maria von Senger und Etterlin the German forces defeated a Soviet offensive by the 2nd Ukrainian Front that was expected to be a precursor of a much larger offensive in Northern Ukraine. The battle of Târgu Frumos has been used as a case study in officer tactical education in the United States Army and other armies, teaching how a mobile defense can defeat an armoured  spearhead. There are however questions about the accounts by the two German officers, relating to the failure to include Romanian forces into their account.

Prelude

During April 1944 a series of offensives by the Red Army, including in the Iaşi sector, was intended to deceive OKH as to the real time and place of the major offensive planned in Belorussia. The German-Romanian forces successfully defended against the local limited objective attacks throughout the month of April. The attack aiming at Târgu Frumos was the initial attempt by the Red Army to achieve its goal of deceiving the OKH, and testing the Axis defenses in Romania while preventing movement of reserves to the Belorussian sector of the Eastern Front.

It had been thought that May Day, the traditional workers' day of celebration, would see the opening of a new assault by the Soviet forces. But the offensive re-opened on 2 May heralding three shattering and unceasing days and nights of combat. Behind a sixty-minute drum fire at dawn, two Soviet armies moved into an attack.

The battle
The battle of Târgu Frumos was a series of engagements and smaller combats over several days during which armoured forces of the Wehrmacht LVII Panzer Corps, in particular of the Grossdeutschland Division and 24th Panzer Division, engaged the Red Army's 16th Tank Corps of the 2nd Tank Army, which was also attacking from the north.

One unit's experience in the opening hours of the battle was described as such:

<blockquote>(1st Battalion), P(an)z(er)Gr(enadier) R(e)g(imen)t G(ross)D(eutschland) and its Romanian allies occupied a well wired-in and T-Mine-strewn line running to the right of 3. SS-Pz.Div. "Totenkopf's" positions. The Soviets advanced in great waves, their tanks and infantry mixed together. Moving much faster than the Germans had anticipated, they overwhelmed...(the 1st Company), wiping it out to the last man. While (the) temporary battalion commander...attempted to halt and repulse the Soviets with what was left of his battalion, the Romanians to the left of (the 2nd Company) cowered in their trenches like "herrings", as (the) company commander...later recounted. Indeed, the Romanians seemed to have reached an unofficial cease fire with the enemy. That night the Luftwaffe succeeded in mounting an air strike in the enemy rear area, to no avail. The next morning the Soviets resumed their attack, preceding it with a bombardment of phosphorus shells. Over 100 enemy tanks and assault guns advanced against (the 3rd Platoon). With his Romanian artillery remaining inactive, (the 3rd Platoon of the 2nd Company) could count only on the support of three...(assault guns) and the four 15cm Nebelwerfer multiple rocket launchers of (the 10th Company, Panzer Artillery Regiment Grossdeutschland). (The 2nd Company) was soon back to the Nebelwerfer's position where it formed a 'hedgehog' defense...and a handful of...men then managed to gain the temporary safety of the railway embankment in their rear. His battalion scattered, (the 1st Battalion commander) sent (the 2nd Company commander) with four SPWs to cover the wide open left flank, completely vulnerable when the Romanians abandoned their positions. Although the enemy had not made any deep penetrations, the tension of the past two days had exhausted the Panzergrenadiers. "Suddenly...four T-34s were in among the SPWs when, as if by magic, tanks and assault guns of the SS-Division "Totenkopf" appeared. Before a single T-34 could train its gun, all had received direct hits." Immediately thereafter Oberst Hans-Ulrich Rudel's Ju 87 Stukas led off a counter thrust by "Totenkopf's" Panzerregiment, accompanied by...four SPWs. The Panzergrenadiers took a measure of revenge for what they had endured over the past 48 hours...before being pulled out of the line to regroup and refit.<ref>McGuirl, Thomas and Remy Spezzano God, Honor, Fatherland: A Photo History of Panzergrenadier Division Grossdeutschland on the Eastern Front 1942-44</ref></blockquote>

Despite initial successes of the Soviet attack, a series of counter-attacks managed to halt the Soviet offensive. The battle reduced Soviet tank strength to a point where a continued attack into Romania was not possible. In the three days of fighting, the Wehrmacht LVII Panzer Corps (mainly Grossdeutschland and 24th Panzer Division) and LII Army Corps defeated the Soviet force and claimed the destruction of over 350 Soviet tanks, ca. 100 of these claimed by 24th Panzer Division. During the battle, Hasso von Manteuffel, commander of the Grossdeutschland division, first encountered the new Soviet Stalin tank, "It was at Târgu Frumos that I first met the Stalin tanks. It was a shock to find that, although my Tigers began to hit them at a range of 3,000 metres, our shells bounced off, and did not penetrate them until we had closed to half that distance. But I was able to counter the Russians' superiority by manoeuvre and mobility, in making the best use of ground cover." Manteuffel also noted that the Stalin tanks had several "disadvantages: slow, not manoeuvrable enough; as well, in my opinion their crews were not sufficiently familiar with the tank."

 Historiography 
Soviet sources make few references to the battle. Historian David Glantz has found some mention of operations in Romania in April and May 1944 in divisional histories. The main source for him is the Soviet 2d Tank Army's history, where a direct reference to the battle is found. It states that in late March 1944, the tank army was shifted into the sector of 27th Army with the mission of "attacking in the direction of Focuri and Podul-Iloaei. Subsequently, the army was to strike a blow toward the city of Yassy and secure it."

In the narrative on follow-on operations by the Tank Army it is stated that it attacked together with 27th Army’s 35th Rifle Corps. It also claims that the 3rd Tank Corps reached Târgu Frumos, but was repulsed by the German counterattacks. The 16th Tank Corps identified by the German officers appears not to be mentioned in the account.

Despite German claims that the Soviet attack was a full-fledged offensive, it appears now that the battle of Târgu Frumos was a relatively small-scale operation in the context of 1944's fighting on the Eastern Front, even though a Soviet success would have put the Red Army into a much stronger position for its eventual attack into Romania.

Aftermath
At the end of the Battle of Târgu Frumos the frontline stabilised. However, it was from these positions that the Soviets launched the successful Jassy–Kishinev Offensive in late August 1944.

On a political level, the battle accelerated the activities of anti-German forces in Romania, leading to negotiations between the traditional political parties and the Romanian Communist Party, represented by Lucrețiu Pătrășcanu.

Formations involved

Soviet
 2nd Ukrainian Front (Ivan Konev)
 Main Shock Group (Tirgu Frumos Axis)
 27th Army (Sergei Trofimenko)
35th Guards Rifle Corps
 3rd Guards Airborne Division
 93rd Guards Rifle Division
 202nd Rifle Division
 206th Rifle Division
 33rd Rifle Corps
78th Rifle Division
 180th Rifle Division
 337th Rifle Division
 40th Army (Filipp Zhmachenko)
 50th Rifle Corps
 4th Guards Rifle Division
 133rd Rifle Division
 163rd Rifle Division
 51st Rifle Corps
 42nd Guards Rifle Division
 74th Rifle Division
 232nd Rifle Division
 104th Rifle Corps
 38th Rifle Division
 240th Rifle Division
 2nd Tank Army (Semyon Bogdanov)
 3rd Tank Corps (50 Tanks)
 50th Tank Brigade
 51st Tank Brigade
 103rd Tank Brigade
 57th Motorized Rifle Brigade
 16th Tank Corps (55 Tanks)
 107th Tank Brigade
 109th Tank Brigade
 164th Tank Brigade
 154th Motorized Rifle Brigade
 11th Guards Tank Brigade (16 Tanks)
 8th Guards Separate Tank Regiment
 13th Guards Separate Tank Regiment
 Northern Shock Group (N of Iasi) Secondary Operations
 52nd Army (Konstantin Koroteyev)
 78th Rifle Corps
 252nd Rifle Division
 303rd Rifle Division
 373rd Rifle Division
 73rd Rifle Corps
 31st Rifle Division
 254th Rifle Division
 294th Rifle Division
 116th Rifle Division (Army Reserve)
 6th Tank Army (Andrei Kravchenko)
 5th Mechanised Corps (20-30 Tanks)
 5th Guards Tank Corps

German
 Army Group South Ukraine (Ferdinand Schörner)
 8th Army (Otto Wöhler)
 LVII Panzer Corps (Friedrich Kirchner)
 Grossdeutschland Division
 23rd Panzer Division
 Battle group of 3rd SS Panzer Division Totenkopf
 IV Armeecorps (Group Mieth) (Friedrich Mieth)
 46th Infantry Division (Wehrmacht)
 24th Panzer Division (Army Reserve)

Romanian
 4th Romanian Army (Ioan Mihail Racoviță)
 I Romanian Army Corps
 8th Infantry Division
 6th Infantry Division
 IV Romanian Army Corps
 7th Infantry Division
 1st Guards Division
 18th Mountain Division
 3rd Infantry Division
 1st Air Corps
 5th Bomber Group
 8th Assault Group (flying German Hs 129 ground attack planes)
 9th Fighter Group

Notes

References

Secondary Print
 Axworthy, Mark  review of "Red Storm Over the Balkans: The Failed Soviet Invasion of Romania, Spring 1944", by David M. Glantz , Journal of Military History, October 2007, vol. 71 I(4), 1282–1283.
 Glantz, David M.,Soviet Military Deception in the Second World War, Frank Cass, London, (1989) 
 Glantz, David M., House, Jonathan When Titans Clashed (1995)
 
 Lucas, James Germany's Elite Panzer Force: Grossdeutschland (MacDonald And Jane's Publishers, Ltd., London, 1978 )
 Spaeter, Helmuth History of the Panzerkorps Grossdeutschland Volume 2 (J.J. Fedorowicz Publishing, Winnipeg, MB, 1995 ) English translation by David Johnston.
 Ziemke, E.F. ‘Stalingrad to Berlin'

Primary Print
 Truppendienst Taschenbuch Band 16, Published by Arbeitsgemeinschaft Truppendienst Vienna 1971
 From the Dnepr to the Vistula: Soviet Offensive Operations - November 1943 - August 1944''. 1985 Art of War symposium, A transcript of Proceedings, COL. D.M Glantz ed., Center for Land Warfare, US Army War College, 29–3 May 1985

Online
 Axis History Forum Let's Build Targul Frumos Discussion
 Aberjona Press Excerpt from Slaughterhouse covering Târgul Frumos
 Narod.ru articles on history of Red Army 89th Guards Rifle and 180th Rifle Divisions
 worldwar2.ro article on Romanian 8th Assault Group

Battles of World War II involving Romania
Battles involving the Soviet Union
Military history of Romania during World War II
Battles and operations of the Soviet–German War
Romania–Soviet Union relations
Battles of World War II involving Germany
May 1944 events